Personal Maid is a 1931 American Pre-Code drama film directed by Monta Bell and Lothar Mendes and written by Adelaide Heilbron and Grace Perkins. The film stars Nancy Carroll, Pat O'Brien, Gene Raymond, Mary Boland, and George Fawcett. The film was released on September 12, 1931, by Paramount Pictures. It is based on the novel of the same title by Grace Perkins.

Cast
Nancy Carroll as Nora Ryan
Pat O'Brien as Peter Shea
Gene Raymond as Dick Gary
Mary Boland as Mrs. Otis Gary
George Fawcett as Gary Gary
Hugh O'Connell as Kipp
Ernest Lawford as Barrows
Charlotte Wynters as Gwen Gary
Jessie Busley as Ma Ryan
Donald Meek as Pa Ryan

See also
The House That Shadows Built (1931) Paramount promotional film with excerpts of Personal Maid

References

External links
 

1931 films
American drama films
1931 drama films
Paramount Pictures films
Films directed by Lothar Mendes
Films directed by Monta Bell
American black-and-white films
1930s English-language films
1930s American films
Films based on American novels